The 1979 Oregon State Beavers football team represented Oregon State University in the Pacific-10 Conference (Pac-10) during the 1979 NCAA Division I-A football season.  In their fourth and final season under head coach Craig Fertig, the Beavers compiled a 1–10 record (1–7 in Pac-10, last), and were outscored 396 to 147.  The team played its five home games on campus at Parker Stadium in Corvallis.

Fertig was fired in October, in the second year of a three-year contract at $33,696 per year. He coached through the end of the season, and lost the finale to Oregon 24–3 in the Civil War, the Beavers' fifth straight loss to the Ducks.

Schedule

References

Oregon State
Oregon State Beavers football seasons
Oregon State Beavers football